Mitchell Hinge (born 26 June 1998) is a professional Australian rules footballer playing for the Adelaide Crows in the Australian Football League (AFL). He made his debut in the win against  at The Gabba in round nine of the 2019 season.

He is the brother of former  player John Hinge.

References

External links

1998 births
Living people
Brisbane Lions players
Australian rules footballers from South Australia
Glenelg Football Club players
People educated at Sacred Heart College, Adelaide
Adelaide Football Club players